The 2021–22 PlusLiga was the 86th season of the Polish Volleyball Championship, the 69th season of the highest tier domestic division in the Polish volleyball league system since its establishment in 1954, and the 22nd season as a professional league. The league is operated by the Polish Volleyball League SA.

This season was composed of 14 teams. The regular season was played as a round-robin tournament. Each team played a total of 26 matches, half at home and half away. The season started on 1 October 2021 and concluded on 14 May 2022.

ZAKSA Kędzierzyn-Koźle won their 9th title of the Polish Champions.

Regular season

Ranking system:
 Points
 Number of victories
 Set ratio
 Setpoint ratio
 H2H results

1st round

2nd round

3rd round

4th round

5th round

6th round

7th round

8th round

9th round

10th round

11th round

12th round

13th round

14th round

15th round

16th round

17th round

18th round

19th round

20th round

21st round

22nd round

23rd round

24th round

25th round

26th round

Playoffs
Quarterfinals
(to 2 victories)

Quarterfinal A

Quarterfinal B

Quarterfinal C

Quarterfinal D

Semifinals
(to 2 victories)

Semifinal A

Semifinal B

Finals
(to 3 victories)

Placement matches

11th place
(to 2 victories)

9th place
(to 2 victories)

7th place
(to 2 victories)

5th place
(to 2 victories)

3rd place
(to 3 victories)

Final standings

Squads

See also
 2021–22 CEV Champions League
 2021–22 CEV Cup

References

External links
 Official website 

PlusLiga
Poland
Plusliga
Plusliga
PlusLiga
PlusLiga